UNICE or Unice may refer to:

Union of Industrial and Employers' Confederations of Europe, (now BusinessEurope), a Brussels-based industry association
Université de Nice Sophia Antipolis, a subsumed public university in France
U.N.I.C.E., a character in Bibleman, an American television series
Únice, a municipality and village in the Czech Republic
Josh Unice (born 1989) U.S. ice hockey player

See also
Ice (disambiguation)
Eunice (disambiguation)
Eunuch (disambiguation)
Unix (disambiguation)
Unix, whose plural is "unices"
Unix-like, sometimes referred to as "unices"
List of Unices, of Unix systems
University of Nice Sophia Antipolis, the university in Nice, France
Digging out of ice
Deicing
UNECE